Wenche Lyngholm (born 13 May 1951 in Moss) is a Norwegian politician for the Socialist Left Party.

She was elected to the Norwegian Parliament from Østfold in 1989, but was not re-elected in 1993.

When the Socialist Left Party entered the Cabinet in 2005, Lyngholm was appointed State Secretary in the Ministry of Government Administration and Reform.

References

1951 births
Living people
Socialist Left Party (Norway) politicians
Women members of the Storting
Members of the Storting
20th-century Norwegian politicians
20th-century Norwegian women politicians